AQ'A Hiroshima Center City is a shopping center located in central Hiroshima operated by the Hiroshima Bus Center.

History
History of AQ'A Hiroshima Center City

Floors
9F - Clinic & Culture
8F - Clinic & Service
7F - Gourmet town - Cafes, Restaurants and discount store
6F - Books Kinokuniya - books, stationeries and DVDs
5F - Life style support
4F - Lady's total fashion
3F - Hiroshima Bus Center
2F - Lady's fashion
1F - Lady's fashion
1B - Parking

Access
Hiroshima Bus Center
Astram Line
Hiroden Main Line and UjinaLine

See also

Hiroshima Bus Center
Sogo
Motomachi Cred
Kamiya-cho Shareo

External links
AQ'A Hiroshima Center City

Buildings and structures in Hiroshima